The Union Democrat is a newspaper that serves the Sonora and Sierra Nevada foothills area of Tuolumne and Calaveras counties, California since 1854.

It was acquired by Oregon-based Western Communications since 1998. Previously, it was owned and published by Harvey and Helen McGee. In 2019, Western Communications declared bankruptcy. It put all its properties, including the Union-Democrat up for sale. The Union Democrat was sold to RISN Operations.

References

External links
Official The Union Democrat website

Newspapers published in California
Mass media in Tuolumne County, California
Sonora, California
Newspapers established in 1854
1854 establishments in California